No. 41 Wing of the RAAF is one of four wings attached to the Royal Australian Air Force's Surveillance and Response Group. The others are Nos. 42, 44 and 92 Wings. The No. 41 Wing Unit is divided into four sub units that are responsible for Air Surveillance both within Australia and abroad; No. 1 Remote Sensor Unit (1 RSU), No. 3 Control and Reporting Unit (3 CRU), No. 114 Mobile Control and Reporting Unit (114 MCRU) and the Surveillance and Control Training Unit (SACTU).

Component units
No. 1 Remote Sensor Unit RAAF
No. 3 Control and Reporting Unit RAAF
No. 114 Mobile Control and Reporting Unit RAAF
Surveillance and Control Training Unit RAAF

References

41
41
41
Military units and formations established in 1943